Sherbet may refer to:

Food and drink
 Sherbet (frozen dessert)
 Sherbet (powder), an effervescent drink or a fizzy powder sweet in, chiefly, the UK, Australia and New Zealand 
 A slang term in the UK and Australia for an alcoholic drink, especially beer; see

Music 
 Sherbet (band), an Australian rock band of the 1970s and early 1980s
 Sherbet (Sherbet album), a 1978 album by Sherbet
 Sherbet (EP), a 2012 by the Japanese girl group Buono!

See also 
 Sharbat (disambiguation)
 Sherbert (disambiguation)
 Sorbet